Kogi is a state in Nigeria.

Kogi may also refer to:

 Kogi people, people who live in the Sierra Nevada de Santa Marta in Colombia
 Kogi language, a Chibchan language of the Kogi people
 Kogi Korean BBQ, a truck-based restaurant in Los Angeles.
 Kogi Kaishakunin, the name for the position of the shōguns executioner, in feudal Japan. This position was highlighted in the comics series Lone Wolf and Cub by the character Ittō Ogami.
 Pi Kogi Enavot, the thirteenth and last month in the Coptic calendar
 KOGI-LP, a low-power radio station (97.7 FM) licensed to serve Big Pine, California, United States